Azopardi is a Maltese surname. Notable people with the surname include:

Francesco Azopardi (1748–1809), Maltese composer and music theorist
Keith Azopardi (born 1967), Gibraltarian lawyer and politician

See also
Azzopardi

Surnames of European origin